The Golden Fleecing may refer to:

The Golden Fleecing, a Scrooge McDuck comic book story
The Golden Fleecing (DuckTales episode), a DuckTales episode
The Golden Fleecing (film), a 1940 film, directed by Leslie Fenton
The Golden Fleecing, an episode of Top Cat where Benny becomes infatuated with a showgirl

See also

Golden Fleece (disambiguation)